Mount Odin is a saddle-top mountain on the Foyn Coast of Graham Land, Antarctica. It is situated close to Frigga Peak to the southwest, on the divide between Anderson Glacier and Sleipnir Glacier. In 1947, the peak was photographed from the air by the Ronne Antarctic Research Expedition (RARE) and charted from the ground by the Falklands Islands Dependencies Survey (FIDS). It was named by FIDS personnel after the Norse god Odin, the mythological husband of Frigga.

References

Odin
Foyn Coast